The Three Kings (German: Ein Mädel und drei Clowns) is a 1929 British-German silent drama film directed by Hans Steinhoff and starring Henry Edwards, Evelyn Holt and Warwick Ward. Separate versions were released in Germany and Britain. At a circus in Blackpool, a violent rivalry breaks out between two of the performers over a woman.

Cast
 Henry Edwards as Edgar King 
 Evelyn Holt as Maria 
 Warwick Ward as Frank King 
 John F. Hamilton as Charlie King
 Clifford McLaglen as Fredo

References

Bibliography
 Low, Rachael. History of the British Film, 1918-1929. George Allen & Unwin, 1971.

External links

1929 films
1929 drama films
Films of the Weimar Republic
British drama films
German drama films
Films directed by Hans Steinhoff
British silent feature films
Films set in England
Films set in Lancashire
Films set in Blackpool
Circus films
German silent feature films
German black-and-white films
British black-and-white films
1920s British films
Silent drama films
1920s German films